My Sky or 'MySky may mean:

 SKY Network Television's "My Sky" brand DVR
 Mead's mySky telescope control
 MySky Aircraft, an American aircraft manufacturer
 MySky (cable channel) in the Philippines